Khansar may refer to:
 Khansar, Iran
 Khansar, Yazd, Iran
 Khansar County, Iran
 Khansar, Pakistan